Bild (alternatively also called Bild TV) is a German free-to-air private news TV channel that represents the television arm of the Bild newspaper. It belongs to the WeltN24 broadcasting group, received its broadcasting license in June 2021, and began broadcasting on 22 August 2021.

Bild is marketed by the publishing subsidiary Visoon Media and is supported by advertising.

License and incorporation 
The broadcasting license required to start broadcasting as a classic television broadcaster with 24/7 operation was applied for in August 2021. On 24 June 2021 the granting of the broadcasting license was announced. At the end of July 2021, Bild began test operations via Astra. On the satellite Astra 19.2 Ost on transponder 33 there was an indication of the planned start of transmission.

Reception and criticism 
In an interview with Johannes Nichelmann from Deutschlandfunk Kultur on 22 August 2021, critic Matthias Dell described Bild TV as "empty, poorly produced and boring" and compared the lack of professionalism of Bild TV with "student television or a public access channel". In his television review on 23 August 2021, Alexander Krei from DWDL.de described the start of broadcasting on the Bild television channel as "television without a resting pulse" and complained that Bild "rushed through the program".

ARD program director Christine Strobl announced on 3 October 2021, one week after the 2021 federal election, that she would take legal action against Bild TV because the broadcaster took over the 6 p.m. election forecasts from ARD and ZDF and for minutes the Berlin round from ARD and ZDF had transmitted. She also said about Bild TV that she found "the type of reporting highly problematic: this type of exaggeration, this focus on dividing society and dealing with facts". It is "clearly pursuing one goal: to discredit public service broadcasting in its entirety."

References

External links 

 Website (German)

Television stations in Berlin
2021 establishments in Germany
Television channels and stations established in 2021
24-hour television news channels in Germany